Dienedione, also known as estra-4,9-diene-3,17-dione, is a synthetic, orally active anabolic-androgenic steroid (AAS) of the 19-nortestosterone group that was never introduced for medical use. It is thought to be a prohormone of dienolone. The drug became a controlled substance in the US on January 4, 2010, and is classified as a Schedule III anabolic steroid under the United States Controlled Substances Act. Previous to this, it was sold as a bodybuilding supplement within the United States, and often mistakenly marketed as a prohormone for trenbolone, a veterinary steroid. Prior to its scheduling, it was part of a number of supplements that were seized during FDA enforcement of Bodybuilding.com for selling unapproved new drugs. The actual active metabolite, dienolone, is almost identical to trenbolone structurally, but lacks the C11 double bond.

See also
 Androstenedione
 Bolandiol
 Bolandione
 Boldione

References

Androgens and anabolic steroids
Estranes